The Jules Frere House is a historic house located at 2404 Sunrise Boulevard in Fort Pierce, Florida. It is locally significant as one of the best examples of the Spanish Colonial Revival style in Fort Pierce, maintaining its original qualities exceptionally well.

Description and history 

Jules Frere was a Fort Pierce merchant and owner of Sunrise Lumber Company. He built the original square, flat-roofed structure and subsequently added the front cathedral portion which was completed in 1931. 

This feature has stunning leaded stained glass in the spine of the ceiling and detailed Florida themed leaded stained glass in the west-facing French doors.  A spiral staircase (no longer in existence) took you to a door leading out onto the flat roof of the original structure. The unique functional wood-burning fireplace is surrounded by marble with decorative appointments. 
The cathedral structure ceiling and upper walls are plaster, with the approximately lower 6ft of the walls tiled to the floor. Floors are tile.

The Underwood family purchased the home from Jules Frere. Around 1940 it was sold to the McDonald family for $4,800.00

In a game of football, the McDonald children damaged the stained glass doors. Famed Florida artist Albert Ernest A. E. Backus, also known as Beanie Backus, was commissioned to handpaint the broken lead tiles to match. 

Over the years the home changed ownership and the detached 2 car garage was converted into a full apartment. 

In 2017, the property and adjacent acreage was again sold. Current resident has painstakingly renovated the features of the home, including authentic roofing and wrought iron work. Fruit trees, landscaping and upgraded hardscape on the site as well as the adjoining 2 acres has been completed.

The interior layout of the Historic home has stayed relatively the same since it was finished in 1931. Arched entryway separates the cathedral addition from the original section. Arched doorways continue into the kitchen and mudroom. Original hardwood flooring runs throughout the dining area and bedrooms. Bathroom, kitchen and mudroom/laundry is tiled flooring.

East-facing backdoor opens out to the expansive 2 acre backyard filled with native plants, tropical fruit trees, Spanish moss draped oak trees and pines. Hardscape walkway to the parking area and apartment were added in 2019.

It was added to the National Register of Historic Places on April 20, 1995.

References

External links
 St. Lucie County listings at National Register of Historic Places

Fort Pierce, Florida
Houses in St. Lucie County, Florida
Houses on the National Register of Historic Places in Florida
National Register of Historic Places in St. Lucie County, Florida
Spanish Colonial Revival architecture in Florida
Houses completed in 1931
1931 establishments in Florida